This is a list of the awards and nominations received by the American television series Judging Amy (1999–2005).

By award

Art Directors Guild (ADG)
2000: Excellence in Production Design Award Television - Single-Camera Series (for "Spoil the Child", nominated)

Emmy Awards
2000: Outstanding Actress - Drama Series (Amy Brenneman for playing "Amy Gray", nominated)
2000: Outstanding Art Direction - Single-Camera Series (for "Spoil the Child", nominated)
2000: Outstanding Supporting Actress - Drama Series (Tyne Daly for playing "Maxine Gray", nominated)
2001: Outstanding Actress - Drama Series (Brenneman, nominated)
2001: Outstanding Supporting Actress - Drama Series (Daly, nominated)
2002: Outstanding Actress - Drama Series (Brenneman, nominated)
2002: Outstanding Music and Lyrics (for the song "The Best Kind of Answer" in "Beating the Bounds", nominated)
2002: Outstanding Supporting Actress - Drama Series (Daly, nominated)
2003: Outstanding Supporting Actress - Drama Series (Daly, won)
2004: Outstanding Supporting Actress - Drama Series (Daly, nominated)
2005: Outstanding Supporting Actress - Drama Series (Daly, nominated)

GLAAD Media Awards
2002: Outstanding Individual Episode - In a Series Without a Regular Gay Character (for "Between the Wanting and the Getting", nominated)

Golden Globe Awards
1999: Best Actress - Drama Series (Amy Brenneman for playing "Amy Gray", nominated)
2000: Best Actress - Drama Series (Brenneman, nominated)
2001: Best Actress - Drama Series (Brenneman, nominated)

Image Awards
1999: Outstanding Supporting Actor - Drama Series (Richard T. Jones for playing "Bruce Van Exel", nominated)

Producers Guild of America (PGA)
1999: Television Producer of the Year Award in Episodic (nominated)

Satellite Awards
2000: Best Actress - Drama Series (Tyne Daly for playing "Maxine Gray", nominated)
2001: Best Actress - Drama Series (Amy Brenneman for playing "Amy Gray", nominated)

Screen Actors Guild (SAG)
2001: Outstanding Actress - Drama Series (Tyne Daly for playing "Maxine Gray", nominated)
2002: Outstanding Actress - Drama Series (Amy Brenneman for playing "Amy Gray", nominated)
2003: Outstanding Actress - Drama Series (Daly, nominated)

Judging Amy